Hosta sieboldii, the small-leaved plantain lily, is a species of flowering plant in the family Asparagaceae, native to Sakhalin, the Kurils, and Japan. A number of cultivars are available.

References

sieboldii
Flora of Sakhalin
Flora of the Kuril Islands
Flora of Japan
Plants described in 1967